Peter Farrell may refer to:

 Peter Farrell (Irish footballer) (1922–1999), Irish footballer for, among others, Shamrock Rovers, Everton and Tranmere Rovers
 Peter Farrell (English footballer) (born 1957), English former football midfielder, played for, among others, Bury, Port Vale and Rochdale; later a manager
 Peter Farrell (politician) (born 1983), American politician in the Virginia House of Delegates
 Peter T. Farrell (1900–1992), American judge from Queens, New York City